Jonathan Desmond Francis Greener (born 9 March 1961) is a British Anglican priest. He was Dean of Wakefield and presiding dean of the Diocese of Leeds. He became Dean of Exeter on 26 November 2017.

Early life and education
Greener was educated at  Reigate Grammar School and Trinity College, Cambridge (whence he gained his Cambridge Master of Arts). After 5 years as Sales and Export Manager with A & M Hearing (a company run by his father) he studied for the priesthood at the College of the Resurrection, Mirfield.

Ordained ministry
Greener was ordained in 1992. He was Assistant Curate at  Holy Trinity with St Matthew, Southwark, while Angus Galbraith was incumbent from 1991 to 1994. During this time he organized the opening of the new Church building and community centre "St Matthew at the Elephant" by Diana, Princess of Wales, one of her final public engagements. He then became the Bishop of Truro's Domestic Chaplain.  He was Vicar of the Church of the Good Shepherd, Brighton from 1996 to 2003 when he became Archdeacon of Pontefract, a post he held until his elevation to the Deanery in 2007.

Greener appeared prominently in a BBC Four television documentary, Cathedrals, broadcast in November 2013.  The programme focused on recent renovations to the cathedral and the impending decision on the Church of England commission's recommendation that the diocese be merged with two other Yorkshire dioceses.

References

1961 births
People educated at Reigate Grammar School
Alumni of Trinity College, Cambridge
Alumni of the College of the Resurrection
Archdeacons of Pontefract
Provosts and Deans of Wakefield
Deans of Exeter
Living people
Anglican Diocese of Leeds